Orlando Urdaneta (b. October 24, 1950 - Maracaibo, Venezuela) is a Venezuelan actor and television personality. He was one of the most outspoken critics of President Hugo Chávez and his fear of retaliation from the Bolivarian Circles made him decide to live in a self-imposed exile in Miami. He worked in "La hora de Orlando" which was broadcast by La Familia Cosmovision in Miami.  He currently works for Telefutura Network's nightly program "Noche de Perros."

Urdaneta received in 1997 the Premio Municipal de Teatro, awarded the best actor and the best theater actor by La Casa del Artista in 1999.  During the years 1998 and 1999, he also won the award as best actor from the Asociación Nacional de Artistas Cinematográficos (ANAC) for his role in Pandemonium and Cien Años de Perdón. As co-writer of Pandemonium, he won the award for the best film screenplay by La Casa del Artista.

He has hosted over the years several TV and radio programs, such as La Rueda de la Fortuna, D'Noche, Estudio 15, Buenos Días Venezuela,  Orlando con Orlando, and Almorzando con Orlando, the latter seen on Televen in 2004. Also Aquí entre nos was seen throughout Latin America and the United States. On radio, he hosted with Pedro León Zapata, a humor and political satire program entitled Pájaro que vas volando. However, it was with his programs Titulares de Mañana and La Hora de Orlando, broadcast by Globovisión, that his criticism against the policies of Hugo Chávez became more vocal. The presentation of his theater production, Orlando en Cadena was sabotaged during July 2002 by the Bolivarian Circles and some of the public was allegedly attacked.

In the 1980s he lived in the Dominican Republic. In July 2004, he decided to move to Miami, United States, with his wife, Morella Ramia, and their two daughters.

Filmography

Films
{| class="wikitable"
! Title
! Director
! Year
|-
|Koati
|Whiskers
|2021
|-
|La Mágica aventura de Óscar
| Diana Sánchez
| 2000
|-
|Juegos bajo la luna
| Mauricio Walerstein
| 2000
|-
|Cédula ciudadano
| Diego Velasco
| 2000
|-
|Borrón y cuenta nueva
| Henrique Lazo
| 2000
|-
|Manuela Sáenz
| Diego Rísquez 
| 2000
|-
|100 años de perdón
| Alejandro Saderman
| 1998
|-
|Salserín
| Luis Alberto Lamata
| 1997
|-
|Pandemonium'
| Román Chalbaud
| 1997
|-
|Aire libre| Luis Armando Roche
| 1996
|-
|Carlito's Way| Brian De Palma
| 1993
|-
|Vidas paralelas| Pastor Vega
| 1993
|-
|Móvil pasional| Mauricio Walerstein
| 1993
|-
|L'Aventure extraordinaire d'un papa peu ordinaire| Philippe Clair
| 1989
|-
| El secreto| Luis Armando Roche
| 1988
|-
|El compromiso| Roberto Siso
| 1988
|-
|Profundo| Antonio Llerandi
|1988
|-
|El escándalo| Carlos Oteyza
| 1987
|-
|La Hora Texaco| Eduardo Barberena
|1985
|-
|El atentado| Thaelman Urgelles
|1985
|-
|Macho y hembra| Mauricio Walerstein
|1984
|-
|La Máxima felicidad| Mauricio Walerstein
|1982
|-
|Under Siege (US) / Hostages (1980 film) (UK) (Traficantes de pánico)
| René Cardona Jr.
| 1980
|-
|Verano salvaje| Enrique Gómez Vadillo
| 1980
|-
|Guyana: Crime of the Century| René Cardona Jr.
| 1979
|-
|Esta loca, loca cámara| Mario Di Pasquale
|1979
|-
|Savana - Sesso e diamanti| Guido Leoni
|1978
|-
|Seagulls Fly Low (I Gabbiani volano basso)
| Giorgio Cristallini
| 1978
|-
|El Fascista, la beata y su hija desvirgada| Joaquín Coll Espona
| 1978
|-
|Perro de alambre| Manuel Caño
| 1978
|-
|El pez que fuma| Román Chalbaud
| 1977
|-
|Los Tracaleros| Alfredo Lugo
| 1977
|-
|Compañero Augusto|Enver Cordido
|1976
|-
|Canción mansa para un pueblo bravo| Giancarlo Carrer
| 1976
|-
|Crónica de un subversivo latinoamericano| Mauricio Walerstein
| 1975
|-
|Cuando quiero llorar no lloro| Mauricio Walerstein
|1972
|}

 Telenovelas and TV appearances 
 Noche de Perros (2011)
 Planeta de 6 (2001)
 Radio Pirata (2001) 
 El País de las mujeres (1998) 
 Mon enfant (Bambino mio) (1994) 
 Gardenia (1990)
 La Señorita Perdomo (1982) 
 La Goajirita (1982) 
 Maite (1981)
 Elizabeth (1981)
 Daniela (1978)
 La Fiera (1978)
 La Zulianita (1977)
 La Mujer prohibida (1973)
 La Loba (1973)
 Peregrina (1973)
 Lucecita (1972) 
 Corazón de madre (1969)
 Sacrificio'' (1967)

Theater
"Orlando en Cadena"
"Divorciarme yo"
"Don Juan", directed by Antonio Constante
"Los Hombros de América", directed by José Ignacio Cabrujas
"Cartas de amor", directed by Miriam Dembo
"Pares y Nines", directed by Fausto Verdial

External links
Official Page
Interview published by the Newspaper El Nacional (2003)

Orlando Urdaneta in VenCOR

People from Maracaibo
Venezuelan male telenovela actors
1946 births
Living people
Venezuelan exiles
Venezuelan television presenters
Venezuelan emigrants to the United States
Venezuelan expatriates in the Dominican Republic